Epischnia asteris is a species of snout moth in the genus Epischnia. It was described by Staudinger in 1870, and is known from France, Great Britain, Portugal and Spain.

The wingspan is 27–30 mm. Adults are on wing in July.

The larvae feed on Inula crithmoides. They can be found from August to September and again from April to May after overwintering.

References

Moths described in 1870
Phycitini
Moths of Europe